Motive Power is a bi-monthly railway related magazine that focuses on diesel locomotives in Australia. The first issue was published on 23 August 1998. Its headquarters is in Sydney. The content includes photographs of locomotives & trains, news about newly delivered and repainted locomotives, technical articles, and fleet listings of the various Australian railway operators. Articles about railway photography itself are sometimes included, as well as articles and advertisements about railway modelling.

Parameters 
 Size      : A4
 Issue     : Number 111 is May/Jun 2017
 Issue     : Number 143 is Jan/Feb 2023 Year 2022 Pictorial issue (84 pages)
 Coverage  : Australia & some modelling
 ISSN      : 1442-7079
 Publisher : Motive Power Publications Pty. Ltd.

See also
 List of railroad-related periodicals

References

External links
 http://www.motivepower.net.au/ (official site)

Rail transport magazines published in Australia
Bi-monthly magazines published in Australia
Magazines established in 1998
Magazines published in Sydney
1998 establishments in Australia